The men's 1000 meter at the 2020 KNSB Dutch Single Distance Championships took place in Heerenveen at the Thialf ice skating rink on Sunday 29 December 2019. There were 22 participants.

Statistics

Result

Source:

Referee: Hanjo Heideman. Assistant: Wil Schildwacht  Starter: Janny Smegen 
Start: 16:41 hr. Finish: 17:13 hr.

Draw

References

Single Distance Championships
2020 Single Distance